Acts 23 is the twenty-third chapter of the Acts of the Apostles in the New Testament of the Christian Bible. It records the period of Paul's imprisonment in Jerusalem then in Caesarea. The book containing this chapter is anonymous but early Christian tradition uniformly affirmed that Luke composed this book as well as the Gospel of Luke.

Text
The original text was written in Koine Greek and is divided into 35 verses.

Textual witnesses
Some early manuscripts containing the text of this chapter are:
 Papyrus 48 (c. AD 250)
 Codex Vaticanus (325–350)
 Codex Sinaiticus (330–360)
 Codex Bezae (c. 400)
 Codex Alexandrinus (400–440)
 Codex Ephraemi Rescriptus (c. 450; extant verses 1–17)
 Codex Laudianus (c. 550)

Locations

The events in this chapter took place in Jerusalem, Antipatris and Caesarea.

Paul before the Sanhedrin (23:1–10)
This part continues the record of Paul's trial before the Sanhedrin from previous chapter. The tribune ordered the Sanhedrin to meet in an advisory capacity to help him 'determine whether or not Paul had a case to answer in Jewish law'.

Verse 2
 And the high priest Ananias commanded them that stood by him to smite him on the mouth.
"The high priest Ananias" (verse 2; cf. 24:1): is Ananias son of Nebedaeus, who was appointed by Herod of Chalcis in 47 CE, and replaced in 59 (Josephus. Antiquities. 20.103, 131, 179, 2O5).

Verse 6
 But when Paul perceived that one part were Sadducees and the other Pharisees, he cried out in the council,"Men and brethren, I am a Pharisee, the son of a Pharisee; concerning the hope and resurrection of the dead I am being judged!"Plots and counterplots (23:11–22)
After the trial, Paul received 'private reassurance' that things happening to him 'are part of God's plan' (verse 11) and the first indication that "his 'witness' in Rome will not be as missionary but as prisoner". When 'the Jews' (the term used by Luke for 'those who are opposed to Paul') decide to assassinate Paul (verses 12–15), and Paul's nephew (verse 16) relays this information to Paul (and Luke), Paul receives 'a high-quality escort' to Caesarea (verses 23–24).

Verse 11

Paul sent to Caesarea (23:23–30)
The necessity and extent of the military escort for Paul's transfer from Jerusalem to Caesarea (verses 23–24) indicate the danger on the roads at this period, which is corroborated by the historian Flavius Josephus (Josephus. Antiquities. 20.160-6, 185–8; Jewish War. 2.253-65). The tribune, Claudius Lysias, 'wrote a letter' (verse 25), telling 'the story in a way more flattering to himself' (verse 27), but 'otherwise repeats for the governor's benefit' what the readers had known.  

Verses 23–24 And he called for two centurions, saying, "Prepare two hundred soldiers, seventy horsemen, and two hundred spearmen to go to Caesarea at the third hour of the night;  and provide mounts to set Paul on, and bring him safely to Felix the governor.""Felix the governor" is mentioned for the first time in the book. According to historical records, Felix was 'a freedman, brother to the imperial secretary Pallas' (Josephus. Jewish War. 2.247, Antiquities. 20.137), was appointed by Claudius to be the procurator of Judea around 52 CE until 60 and generally regarded as cruel and corrupt (cf. Tacitus. Hist. 5.9), even was indicted by the Jews of Caesarea after his retirement from office (Josephus. Antiquities. 20.182) He was replaced by Festus (Josephus. Jewish War. 2.271; Antiquities. 182).

The journey to Caesarea (23:31–35)
Caesarea is located about 110 kilometer from Jerusalem by road, and Antipatris (verse 31) is about half-way, 'at the point where the hill-country road intersects with the road running north from Lydda along the coastal plain'. Paul was then detained in Herod's praetorium (verse 35), where some scholars have suggested is the place the Epistle to the Philippians could have been written (cf. ), as an alternative opinions to Rome as the traditional origin.

Verse 31Then the soldiers, as they were commanded, took Paul and brought him by night to Antipatris."Antipatris", on the road from Jerusalem to Caesarea (at 26 miles distant from Caesarea), was built by Herod the Great (Herod I), who named it after his father "Antipater".

Verse 33When they came to Caesarea and had delivered the letter to the governor, they also presented Paul to him."Presented": from Greek: , '', is a word 'particularly used of setting any one before a judge' (cf. , and the subscription of 2 Timothy).

See also 

 Related Bible parts: Acts 21, Acts 22, Acts 29

References

Sources

External links
 King James Bible - Wikisource
English Translation with Parallel Latin Vulgate
Online Bible at GospelHall.org (ESV, KJV, Darby, American Standard Version, Bible in Basic English)
Multiple bible versions at Bible Gateway (NKJV, NIV, NRSV etc.)

23